Aaj Samaj is a Hindi daily newspaper in India. The newspaper is managed by Good Morning India Media Private Limited Group.

History
Aaj Samaj was founded in 2007 in New Delhi. In 2009, it added editions for Haryana, Chandigarh, Panchkula, and Mohali.

References

External links 

Hindi-language newspapers
Daily newspapers published in India